The soundtrack album of the sixth season of HBO series Game of Thrones, titled Game of Thrones: Season 6, was released digitally on June 24, 2016, and later released on CD on July 29, 2016. "Light of the Seven" is the first time piano is used in the music for Game of Thrones. The album was composed by Ramin Djawadi. The soundtrack has received favorable reviews and peaked at number 1 on the US Billboard Soundtrack Albums chart and number 27 on the US Billboard 200. The track from the season finale, "Light of the Seven", reached number 1 on Billboards Spotify Viral 50 chart. It won an International Film Music Critics Association for Best Original Score for a Television Series.

Reception
The soundtrack received positive reviews from critics.

Track listing

Credits and personnel
Personnel adapted from the album liner notes.

 David Benioff – liner notes
 Ramin Djawadi – composer, primary artist, producer
 D. B. Weiss – liner notes

Charts

Awards and nominations

Notes

References

Ramin Djawadi soundtracks
2016 soundtrack albums
Soundtrack
Classical music soundtracks
Instrumental soundtracks
Television soundtracks
WaterTower Music soundtracks